Johann Ludwig von Hagen (1492–1547) was the Archbishop-Elector of Trier from 1540 to 1547.

Biography

Johann Ludwig von Hagen was born in Pfalzel near Trier in 1492, the son of Friedrich von Hagen, Amtmann of the Archbishopric of Trier.  He studied in Paris and Cologne and then held various ecclesiastical positions in the Archbishopric of Trier.

On 9 August 1540 the cathedral chapter of the Cathedral of Trier elected Johann Ludwig von Hagen as the new Archbishop of Trier.  Pope Paul III confirmed the appointment on 10 December 1540.  During his time as archbishop, he attended regularly to his ecclesiastical duties and opposed the Protestant Reformation.  During the Schmalkaldic War, large areas of the Archbishopric of Trier were devastated by armies, especially Koblenz and the surrounding area.

Johann Ludwig von Hagen died in Ehrenbreitstein on 23 March 1547.  He is buried in the Cathedral of Trier.  His tomb was destroyed in 1804.

References

This page was based on this page on German Wikipedia.

1492 births
1547 deaths
John 04